City of Fire is the eponymous debut album by Canadian metal band City of Fire.

Background
The album features a cover of The Cult's "Rain" and T. Rex's "Children of the Revolution".

Vocalist Burton C. Bell said:

Track listing

Personnel
Burton C. Bell – vocals
Byron Stroud – bass
Sho Murray – guitar
Ian White – guitar
Bob Wagner – drums

References 

2010 debut albums
City of Fire (band) albums
Candlelight Records albums